The 1941 Toronto Argonauts season was the 55th season for the team since the franchise's inception in 1873. The team finished in second place in the Eastern Rugby Football Union with a 5–1 record and qualified for the playoffs, but lost the two-game total-points ERFU Final series to the Ottawa Rough Riders.

Regular season

Standings

Schedule
As part of the festivities marking the centenary of Queen's University, the regular-season game between the Argos and Bulldogs on 18 October was played at Richardson Stadium in Kingston, Ontario by agreement between the organizers and the Montreal club.

Postseason

References

Toronto Argonauts seasons